The Europe Zone was one of the two regional zones of the 1950 Davis Cup.

22 teams entered the Europe Zone, with the winner going on to compete in the Inter-Zonal Final against the winner of the America Zone. Sweden defeated Denmark in the final, and went on to face Australia in the Inter-Zonal Final.

Draw

First round

Philippines vs. Pakistan

Netherlands vs. Sweden

Belgium vs. Finland

Yugoslavia vs. Austria

Great Britain vs. Italy

Second round

Poland vs. Israel

Ireland vs. Monaco

Norway vs. Sweden

Yugoslavia vs. Belgium

Luxembourg vs. Italy

Denmark vs. Egypt

France vs. Switzerland

Quarterfinals

Poland vs. Ireland

Sweden vs. Philippines

Belgium vs. Italy

Denmark vs. France

Semifinals

Sweden vs. Poland

Denmark vs. Italy

Final

Sweden vs. Denmark

References

External links
Davis Cup official website

Davis Cup Europe/Africa Zone
Europe Zone
Davis Cup